Galium texense, the Texas bedstraw, is a species of plants in the coffee family. It is native to Texas, Oklahoma and Arkansas.

References

External links
US Department of Agriculture plant profile

texense
Flora of Texas
Flora of Oklahoma
Flora of Arkansas
Plants described in 1841
Flora without expected TNC conservation status